CDC4 may refer to:
 Cell division control protein 4
 Saint-Quentin Aerodrome